Shadow of the Law is a 1926 American silent crime drama film starring Clara Bow as a woman sent to prison for a crime she did not commit. Directed by Wallace Worsley, the screenplay was written by Leah Baird and Grover Jones and was based on the novel Two Gates by Harry Chapman Ford. Shadow of the Law is now regarded as lost.

Plot
As described in a film magazine review, Mary Brophy, a young  woman who is unjustly jailed by a master crook whom she refuses to wed, later meets and falls in love with James Reynolds, a young man who becomes her protector. While Mary is in jail, her father falls under the evil influence of the criminal gang leader. At a reception the young woman’s father is shot by the man she refused to wed. He is brought to justice and her romance thereafter goes smoothly.

Cast

References

External links

1926 films
1926 crime drama films
American crime drama films
American silent feature films
American black-and-white films
Films based on American novels
Films directed by Wallace Worsley
Lost American films
Associated Exhibitors films
Lost crime drama films
1926 lost films
1920s American films
Silent American drama films